The Universitätsbibliothek Kassel (or Kassel University Library) is a library located in the city of Kassel, Germany.  Composed of the collections of the former Landesbibliothek (state library)  and Murhardsche Bibliothek der Stadt Kassel (Murhard Library of the City of Kassel) as well as that of the Kassel University library, amongst the library's holdings is the manuscript of the 9th-century German poem, the Hildebrandslied.

The first component of the library, the Landesbibliothek, evolved from the collection of the Kassel Court Library of the Landgraves of Hesse, and was officially made a "state library" with the Hesse Constitution of 1831.  Its collection was housed at the Fridericianum, continental Europe's first public museum, and specialized in the fields of history, philology, archaeology, art, geography, theology, and law.

The second component library, the Murhardsche Bibliothek der Stadt Kassel long served as the city's second research library.  Founded in 1845 by the brothers Friedrich and Karl Murhard, sons of an old Hessian merchant dynasty, it specialized in political science, economics, and pedagogy.

The third component library comprised the holdings of Kassel University, founded in it modern incarnation in 1970.

The three libraries were merged into a single system in 1976.

References 
Popa, Opritsa D. (2003) Bibliophiles and Bibliothieves: the search for the Hildebrandslied and the Willehalm Codex. Berlin: Walter de Gruyter

Further reading

 Hans-Jürgen Kahlfuß (ed.): 125 Jahre Murhardsche Stiftung der Stadt Kassel und ihrer Bibliothek 1863–1988. Kassel: Verein für Hess. Geschichte u. Landeskunde c/o GhK-Bibliothek 1988. 
 Søren Drews: 100 Jahre Murhardsche Bibliothek. Vortrag anlässlich der Kasseler Museumsnacht am 3. September 2005 im Eulensaal der Murhardschen Bibliothek Kassel. Kassel 2005
 Axel Halle (ed.): Die Brüder Murhard: Leben für Menschenrechte und Bürgerfreiheit; Katalog zur Ausstellung im Stadtmuseum Kassel in Zusammenarbeit mit der Universitätsbibliothek Kassel, 30. November 2003 bis 18. April 2004. Kassel: University Press 2003.

External links 
 

Kassel
Buildings and structures in Kassel
University of Kassel
Libraries established in 1976